Mount Noel is a mountain in the Traverse Mountains of Antarctica. It is south of McHugo Peak and north of Mount Allan. It was named for John Fraser Noel (1942-1966) who died in a sledging accident near Tragic Corner while employed by the British Antarctic Survey.

References

Noel